Santamaria was a company in North-West Italy producing motor bikes with 49cc, 69cc, 98cc, 123cc and 147cc engines produced by Franco Morini, JLO, Minarelli, Sachs, Zundapp.

Models produced (incomplete) 
Tigrotto
Tigrotto Sport

References

Defunct motorcycle manufacturers of Italy